Meldrim is an unincorporated community in Effingham County, Georgia, United States, located about 17 miles northwest of Savannah.
It is most likely named for Peter Meldrim, a nineteenth century politician, judge and army officer from Georgia.  The ZIP Code for Meldrim is 31318.

It is the site of a paper mill, and is noted for a 1959 railway disaster.

Notes

Unincorporated communities in Effingham County, Georgia
Unincorporated communities in Georgia (U.S. state)